Alpha Diagana (born 5 November 1993) is a Mauritanian sprinter. He competed in the men's 100 metres event at the 2019 World Athletics Championships in Doha, Qatar. He competed in the preliminary round and he did not advance to compete in the heats.

References

External links 
 

Living people
1993 births
Place of birth missing (living people)
Mauritanian male sprinters
World Athletics Championships athletes for Mauritania